Momentive Inc. is an American chemical company. Its products include silicones and quartz.

Momentive is headquartered in Waterford, New York. The company employs 9,200 employees across more than 50 locations throughout North America, Europe, Asia, and South America. In 2019, it had sales of $6.5 billion. The company was ranked as the 64th largest private company in the United States by Forbes in 2019. Momentive is the fourth-largest manufacturer in the Capital Region of New York State employing roughly 1,000 at its Waterford plant.

History
The company traces its origins back to GE research chemist Eugene G. Rochow, who first described the direct process. 
Momentive Performance Materials was later formed as a result of the sale of GE Advanced Materials to Apollo Management in 2006. After bankruptcy in 2014, and a stock offering in 2017, the company is a wholly-owned subsidiary of the South Korean Investors Group.

In 2021, the company was assessed over $2 million in penalties by the New York State Department of Environmental Conservation as a result of air, water and hazardous waste law violations that had occurred at their Waterford facility since 2007.

Products 
Momentive's products include silicones used in several markets., as well as quartz and ceramic materials. 
The company also produces raw materials such as siloxane polymers and various additives, including silanes, specialty fluids, and urethane additives.

References

External links
 

Chemical companies of the United States
Manufacturing companies based in New York (state)
Privately held companies based in New York (state)
Companies based in Saratoga County, New York
Companies that filed for Chapter 11 bankruptcy in 2014